414th may refer to:

414th Bombardment Squadron, inactive United States Air Force unit
414th Combat Training Squadron, United States Air Force unit
414th Fighter Group (414th FG), active United States Air Force unit
414th Infantry Regiment (United States), currently a Drill Sergeant Unit headquartered in Eugene, Oregon

Other uses
 No. 414 Squadron RCAF, Canadian Forces, Royal Canadian Air Force
 414 Panzer Battalion, German-Dutch tank battalion

414 vehicles
 Russian submarine Daniil Moskovsky (B-414)
 German submarine U-414
 USS Springer (SS-414)
 USS Russell (DD-414)
 HM LST-414

See also
414 (disambiguation)
414 (number)
414, the year 414 (CDXIV) of the Julian calendar
414 BC